Rudolf Thome (born 14 November 1939) is a German film director and producer. He has directed more than 30 films since 1964. His 1986 film Tarot was entered into the 15th Moscow International Film Festival.

Selected filmography
Director

 Detectives (1969)
 Red Sun (1970)
 Supergirl (1971)
  (1972)
  (1974)
  (1975)
  (1979)
  (1980)
  (1983)
 Tarot (1986)
  (1988)
  (1989)
  (1989)
  (1991)
  (1992)
  (1995)
  (1998)
  (1998)
  (2000)
  (2000)
  (2003)
  (2004)
  (2006)
  (2006)
  (2007)
  (2009)
  (2010)
  (2012)

Actor
 Forty Eight Hours to Acapulco (1967)
  (1975)

References

External links

1939 births
Living people
Film people from Hesse
People from Main-Taunus-Kreis